The following is a timeline of the history of the city of Shanghai in China.

Prior to 1800 

 5th-7th c. CE - Fishing village develops where Suzhou Creek enters the Huangpu River.
 751 CE - Area becomes part of Huating county.
 976 CE - Longhua Temple rebuilt.
 12th c. - Market town develops.
 1216 - Jing'an Temple built.
 1292 - Town becomes county seat.
 1294 - Wen Miao (temple) active.
 1554 - City walls constructed.
 1732 - Customs office relocated to Shanghai from Songjiang.
 1780 - Yu Garden opens.
 1789 - Guyi Garden becomes communal property.

1800-1900
 1842
 19 June: Shanghai taken by British forces.
 Shanghai opens to foreigners per Treaty of Nanking.
 1843 Captain George Balfour appointed British consul.
 1845
 David Sassoon & Sons in business.
 British settlement established on outskirts of Old City.
 1846 - Richards' Hotel and Restaurant in business.
 1849 - French Concession granted.
 1850
 North-China Herald newspaper begins publication.
 Collège Saint Ignace founded.
 1851 - Jardine, Matheson & Co. branch built.
 1853
 Small Swords Society occupies Old City.
 April: Shanghai Volunteer Corps organized.
 1854
 Imperial Maritime Custom Offices installed.
 Shanghai Municipal Council formed by westerners.
 1855 - Shanghai Race Club founded.
 1856 - Wills' Bridge constructed.
 1857 - Royal Asiatic Society North-China Branch established.
 1859 - Astor House Hotel in business.
 1860
 August: Taiping rebels unsuccessfully attempt to take city.
 New Northern Gate built into city wall.
 1861
 Battle of Shanghai (1861).
 Correspondent's Club formed by British residents.
 1862
 American settlement established.
 Saint Joseph's Church consecrated.
 1863 - Hongkou becomes part of American Concession.
 1865
 Kiangnan Arsenal and Long Men College established.
 Hongkong and Shanghai Banking Corporation branch opens.
 British Supreme Court for China established.
 Gas lighting introduced.
 1866 - Butterfield & Swire in business.
 1868 - Musee de Zikawei founded.
 1869 - Holy Trinity Church consecrated; designed by George Gilbert Scott.
 1871 - August: Typhoon.
 1872 - Shen Bao newspaper begins publication.
 1874
 Rickshaws introduced.
 Natural history museum established by Royal Asiatic Society North-China Branch.
 1876 - Woosung Railway begins operating.
 1881 - Population: 302,767.
 1882
 Jade Buddha Temple founded.
 Electricity introduced.
 1884 - Dianshizhai-huabao (magazine) begins publication.
 1889 - Ostasiatischer Lloyd newspaper begins publication.
 1895 - Population: 411,753.
 1896 - Nanyang Public School and Consulate-General of Russia in Shanghai established.
 1897 - 22 June: British nationals conduct jubilee events.
 1898
 Songhu Railway begins operating.
 Bubbling Well cemetery established.

1900-2000

1900s
 1901 - Hardoon & Company in business.
 1905 - Kiangnan Shipyard and Fudan College established.
 1907 - Waibaidu Bridge constructed.
 1908
 Nanjing-Shanghai Railway, Shanghai South railway station, Palace Hotel, and New Stage built.
 Electric tram begins operating.
 Art exhibit held in Shanghai Mutual Telephone Company building.
 Hongkou cinema opens.
 1909
 Shanghai railway station and Shanghai Industrial College established.
 Shanghai–Hangzhou Railway begins operating.
 New gates built into city wall.

1910s
 1910
 St. Ignatius Cathedral and Shanghai Club Building constructed.
 Shanghai Oil Painting Institute, and Eastern City Women's Art School founded.
 1912 - Old City walls dismantled.
 1913 - Shanghai Art School, Women's Art and Embroidery Institute, and Xinmin Theater Research Society founded.
 1914 - Trolleybus begins operating along Fokein Road.
 1916 - Asia Building and Union Building constructed on The Bund.
 1917
 Millard's Review of the Far East begins publication.
 Sincere Department Store branch in business.

1920s
 1920 - Shanghai Mint established.
 1921
 July: Chinese Communist Party founded during meeting in Xintiandi.
 Mingxing Film Company founded.
 1923
 Hongqiao Airport in operation.
 Hongkong and Shanghai Banking Corporation building constructed.
 1924 - General Post Office Building and North China Daily News Building constructed.
 1925
 30 May: Protest quashed; May Thirtieth Movement launched.
 Shanghai East Library opens.
 Tianyi Film Company in business.
 Institute of Chartered Accountants organized.
 1927
 Shanghai Commune of 1927 active.
 12 April: Shanghai massacre of 1927.
 7 July: Huang Fu becomes mayor.
 Shanghai Conservatory of Music founded.
 Customs House, Zhapu Road Bridge, and Ohel Moishe Synagogue built.
 City becomes a special municipality.
 1928 - Fahua District becomes part of city.
 1929
 Chang Ch'ün becomes mayor.
 Shanghai Stock Exchange formed.
 Xinmin Po and Shanghai Evening Post & Mercury newspapers begin publication.
 Sassoon House built.

1930s
 1930 - Nanking Theatre founded.
 1932
 January 28 Incident
 January: Wu Tiecheng becomes mayor.
 Grand Theatre rebuilt.
 1933 - Paramount Ballroom opens.
 1934 - Shanghai Joint Savings Society Building constructed.
 1935
 EWO Brewery Ltd. in business.
 Sheshan Basilica and Broadway Mansions built.
 1937
 April: Yu Hung-Chun becomes mayor.
 13 August - 26 November: Battle of Shanghai; Japanese occupation begins.
 26 October - 1 November: Defense of Sihang Warehouse.
 Bank of China Building constructed.
 1938 - Wen Hui Bao newspaper begins publication.
 1939 - Shanghai Jewish Chronicle begins publication.

1940s
 1940 - November: Chen Gongbo becomes mayor.
 1943 - British and American concessions end.
 1944 - December: Zhou Fohai becomes mayor.
 1945
 Japanese occupation ends.
 August: K. C. Wu becomes mayor.
 City divided into 30 administrative districts.
 Shanghai Theatre Academy established.
 1946 - French concession ends.
 1947 – Constitution of the Republic of China passes.
 1949
 Rao Shushi becomes Shanghai Party Committee Secretary.
 May: Chen Yi becomes mayor.
 May–June: Shanghai Campaign.
 Jiefang Daily newspaper begins publication.
 Shanghai Film Studio founded.
 October: Proclamation of the People's Republic of China.
 Shanghai residents find refuge on the island of Taiwan with some fleeing to Hong Kong.

1950s
 1950
 Chen Yi becomes Party Committee Secretary.
 Shanghai Women's Federation founded.
 1951 - Shanghai Shenhua Football Club formed.
 1952 - Shanghai Museum, Shanghai Banking School, and Shanghai Chinese Orchestra founded.
 1953 - Population: 6,204,417.
 1954
 Ke Qingshi becomes Party Committee Secretary.
 Shanghai Zoo and Shanghai Teachers Training College established.
 Jing'an Park developed.
 1955
 Shanghai Exhibition Centre completed
 Hongkou Stadium opens.
 Shanghai Internal Combustion Engine Components Company in business.
 1956 - Shanghai Natural History Museum established.
 1958
 Shanghai Academy of Social Sciences founded.
 Ke Qingshi becomes mayor.
 Baoshan, Fengxian, Jiadang, Jinshan, Qingpu, Songjiang districts and Chongming County become part of city.
 1959 - Drunken Bai Garden opens.

1960s
 1960 - Shanghai Institute of Foreign Languages established.
 1961 - Yu Garden opens.
 1964 - Population: 10,816,500.
 1965
 Chen Pixian becomes CPC Party chief.
 Cao Diqiu becomes mayor.
 Cucumber Lane renovated.
 1966 - Cultural Revolution begins.
 1967
 Shanghai People's Commune active.
 Zhang Chunqiao becomes mayor.

1970s
 1970
 One Strike-Three Anti Campaign.
 Population: 10,820,000.
 1971 - Zhang Chunqiao becomes Party Committee Secretary.
 1972 - Richard Nixon visits city.
 1974 - Shanghai Botanical Garden established.
 1976 - Su Zhenhua becomes Party Committee Secretary.
 1978 - Shanghai Translation Publishing House founded.
 1979
 Peng Chong becomes Party Committee Secretary.
 Sister city relationship established with San Francisco, USA.

1980s
 1980
 Shanghai Bar Association founded.
 Chen Guodong becomes Party Committee Secretary.
 1981 - Wang Daohan becomes mayor.
 1982 - Population: 6,292,960 city; 11,859,700 (urban agglomeration).
 1983 - Shanghai History & Cultural Relics Showroom opens.
 1984 - Shanghai University of Political Science and Law founded.
 1985
 Rui Xingwen becomes Party Committee Secretary.
 Jiang Zemin becomes mayor.
 Shanghai Daoist Association established.
 Wenhui Book Review begins publication.
 1987 - Jiang Zemin becomes Party Committee Secretary.
 1988
 Zhu Rongji becomes mayor.
 Jin Jiang Tower built.
 1989
 Protests.
 Zhu Rongji becomes Party Committee Secretary.

1990s
 1990 - Population: 13,341,900.
 1991
 Nanpu Bridge and Yangpu Bridge open.
 Wu Bangguo becomes Party Committee Secretary.
 Huang Ju becomes mayor.
 The Chinese Republic on Taiwan unofficially abandoned the claims to Shanghai after amending the constitution.
 1992 - Shanghai Star newspaper begins publication.
 1993
 Pudong Special Economic Zone established.
 Shanghai Metro begins operation.
 Shanghai International Film Festival begins.
 1994
Huang Ju becomes Party Committee Secretary.
 Oriental Pearl Tower constructed in Lujiazui.
Australian Chamber of Commerce Shanghai established.
 1995
 Xu Kuangdi becomes mayor.
 Dajing Ge Pavilion museum opens (approximate date).
 1996
 Shanghai Library building opens.
 Shanghai Biennale art exhibit begins.
 Yan'an Elevated Road and King Tower built.
 Canadian Chamber of Commerce in Shanghai established.
 1997 - Xupu Bridge opens.
 1998
 Shanghai Grand Theatre opens.
 Jin Mao Tower, Shanghai Sen Mao International Building, Shanghai Futures Building, and Lippo Plaza built.
 1999
 Shanghai Pudong International Airport begins operating.
 Shanghai Century Publishing Group established.
 Shanghai Daily newspaper begins publication.
 Shanghai public transport card launched.
 2000
 International Ocean Shipping Building, World Finance Tower, and Bank of China Tower constructed.
 Fireworks Festival begins.
 Population: 16,407,700.

21st century

2000s
 2001
 Chen Liangyu becomes mayor.
 Plaza 66 and Pudong International Information Port built.
 Shanghai Film Group Corporation in business.
 Benelux Business Association established.
 2002
 Chen Liangyu becomes Party Committee Secretary.
 Shanghai Ocean Aquarium and Super Brand Mall open.
 Shanghai Fashion Week begins.
 Shanghai Golden Eagles baseball team formed.
 2003
 Han Zheng becomes mayor.
 Lupu Bridge opens.
 Tomorrow Square, Shanghai Dong Hai Plaza, Aurora Plaza, and Raffles Square built.
 Nanhui New City construction begins.
 2004
 Shanghai Maglev Train begins operating.
 Shanghai Railway Museum and Shanghai International Circuit open.
 Chinese Grand Prix begins.
 2005
 Shanghai Institute of Visual Art and Shanghai City Symphonic Orchestra established.
 Donghai Bridge, Shimao International Plaza, Grand Gateway Shanghai, Longemont Shanghai, Citigroup Tower, and Bank of Shanghai Headquarters built.
 Shanghai Oriental Art Center and Qi Zhong Stadium inaugurated.
 2006
 Han Zheng becomes Party Committee Secretary.
 Shanghai pension scandal.
 Island6 Art Center opens.
 Chenghuang Miao (temple) restored.
 PLA Unit 61398 active (approximate date).
 2007
 Xi Jinping becomes Party Committee Secretary, succeeded by Yu Zhengsheng.
 Oasis Skyway Garden Hotel built.
 2008 - Shanghai World Financial Center, One Lujiazui, and Zhongrong Jasper Tower built.
 2009
 Shanghai Pride begins.
 Shanghai Yangtze River Tunnel and Bridge and Happy Valley (amusement park) open.
 Shanghai Masters tennis tournament held.

2010s

 2010
 Expo 2010 Shanghai China (world expo) held.
 Shanghai Arena opens.
 Minpu Bridge and Shanghai Wheelock Square built.
 15 November: Fire on Jiaozhou Road, Jing'an District.
 Population: 23,019,148.
 2011
 Beijing–Shanghai High-Speed Railway begins operating.
 Huamin King Tower built.
 2012
 November: Han Zheng becomes Party Committee Secretary.
 December: Yang Xiong becomes mayor.
 Power Station of Art opens.
 Turkish Chamber of Commerce established.
 2014
 31 December: 2014 Shanghai stampede
2016
June 16: Shanghai Disneyland Park opened.
2017
26 April : Shanghai Tower officially opened its sightseeing deck to the public.
 10 June: Protest against changes to housing regulations by the municipal authorities on  Nanjing Road

See also 

 History of Shanghai
 List of historic buildings in Shanghai
 List of administrative divisions of Shanghai
 List of township-level divisions of Shanghai
 List of Shanghai Metro stations
 List of universities and colleges in Shanghai
 Major National Historical and Cultural Sites (Shanghai)
 List of economic and technological development zones in Shanghai
 Urbanization in China

References

Bibliography

Published in the 19th century

Published in the 20th century
 
 
 
 
 
 
 
 
 
 
 
 
 
 
 
 
 David Fraser, “Inventing Oasis: Luxury Housing Advertisements and Reconfiguring Domestic Space in Shanghai,” chapter 2 in The Consumer Revolution in Urban China (Berkeley: University of California Press, 2000) 25-53.

Published in the 21st century
 2000s
 
 
 
 
 
 
 
 Piper Gaubatz, “Globalization and the Development of New Central Business Districts in Beijing, Shanghai and Guangzhou,” chapter 6 in Restructuring the Chinese City: Changing Society, Economy and Space (New York: Routledge, 2005) 98-121.
 
 
 
 
 
 

 2010s

External links 

 Items related to Shanghai, various dates (via Digital Public Library of America).

Timeline
Shanghai
Shanghai-related lists
shanghai